Lo Que Me Haces Sentir is the fourth studio album by Mexican singer Zemmoa, released digitally and on vinyl on 2021.

Background 
Produced by Juan Soto, Fernando Burgos from Hello Seahorse!, Martin Grinfeld, Imanol González, America Fendi and Zemmoa.

Zemmoa presented her new singles at Chicago's National Museum of Mexican Art's Sonido 18 Fest celebrated at Harrison Park next to Girl Ultra, Mi Sobrino Memo, and Sussie 4.

On the album, Zemmoa includes "Te Quiero" and her piano-only version, "Te Quiero Mucho", which she interprets as a bolero.

Zemmoa shared that her favorite song from this album is “Nota De Voz”, inspired by the poems from Pita Amor and "Los amorosos" by Jaime Sabines.

Singles

Velocidad 
In 2021 she presented her song "Velocidad", which is the first single from the fourth album Lo Que Me Haces Sentir and in her video she drives around Mexico City in her red convertible car that ends up in flames.

Ya Te Vi 
Her second video from this album is «Ya te vi» featuring Nomi Ruiz where they are playing cards until they find The Devil (Tarot card) symbolizing a toxic relationship.

Pendejo 
In her video "Pendejo" she features some of her friend performing a lip sync of her song while protesting against transphobia, misogyny, patriarchy and machismo; Alejandra Quesada, Alexis De Anda, Luisa Almaguer, Andy Walrus Perrilla Mirreyna, Agustina Quinci,  Burbiculo, Dani Tormento, Derretida, Giselle Elias Karam, Enriqueta Arias, Jessy Bulbo from Las Ultrasonicas, Juliette Kovac, Miss Loreto, Hababy LaGuapiss, Laura De Ita, Miss Mara, Dany Torres NegraConda, Noa Sainz, Marian Ruzzi, Melon Rivas, Ophelia Pastrana, Paulina Barceinas, Pambo, rRoxymore, Rohl Sánchez, Miley Sayrus, Sarah Fanelli, Tamerlane and Vanessa Zamora.

Mi Amor Soy Yo 
In her song Mi Amor Soy Yo features Tessa Ía (Camila Sodi's sister) and the high-energy duet Trans-X which samples El Cóndor Pasa (song) while having at sleepover or slumber party at her parents house in Cuernavaca.

Los 12 Pasos 
Her video "Los 12 pasos" references the Time Warp (song) from Rocky Horror Picture Show and an Alcoholics Anonymous meeting.

El Trono 
The music video for "El Trono" has a funky rhythm similar to Grace Jones and she dances in front of a king's throne and a Mona Lisa painting with the face of Gloria Trevi.

Como La Primera Vez 
In her video "Como La Primera Vez" featuring Valentina (drag queen) contestant from RuPaul's Drag Race (season 9) and the transgender DJ and Mexican producer America Fendi.

La Música Puede Llevarte 
Her new song "La Música Puede Llevarte" has some Dream pop influences from Jessica 6 (band), chillout, TR/ST and  Beach House.

Track listing

Personnel 
 Zemmoa – piano, lyrics, vocals
 Nomi Ruiz – lyrics, vocals
 Tessa Ía – vocals
 Valentina (drag queen) – vocals
 America Fendi – vocals
 Fernando Burgos – music
 Tomas Jackson – bass
 Kmaron – guitar
 Pascal Langurand Trans-X – keytar

Appearances 
Zemmoa at the National Museum of Mexican Art, Chicago in 2018.

To celebrate 15 years of her musical career, she announced the tour “Lo Que Tour Me Haces Sentir”, at Foro Indie Rocks with Mancandy, Manu NNa and Amelia Waldorf.

References 

2021 albums
Spanish-language albums